Tom Kearney may refer to:

 Tom Kearney (fencer) (1923–?), Irish Olympic fencer
 Tom Kearney (footballer) (born 1981), English footballer
 Thomas Henry Kearney (1874–1956), American botanist
 Andrew Thomas Kearney (1892–1962), American management consultant

See also
Tom Cairney (born 1991), footballer